Agombar is a surname of French Huguenot origin. Notable people with the surname include:

Harry Agombar (born 1992), English footballer
Jessica Agombar, British songwriter, previously member of the band Parade

References